Ferguson Rises is a 2021 documentary film about the Shooting of Michael Brown.

The film premiered on US broadcast television on November 8, 2021, on Independent Lens on PBS.

References

External links
 Ferguson Rises
 Official website

2021 documentary films